Princess Amélie Louise of Arenberg, full German name: Amalie Luise, Prinzessin und Herzogin von Arenberg and full French name: Amélie Louise, princesse et duchesse d'Arenberg, (born 10 April 1789 in Brussels, Austrian Netherlands; died 4 April 1823 in Bamberg, Kingdom of Bavaria) was a member of the House of Arenberg by birth and, through her marriage to Duke Pius August in Bavaria, a member of the Palatinate-Birkenfeld-Gelnhausen line of the House of Wittelsbach. Amélie Louise was a grandmother of Empress Elisabeth of Austria through her son Duke Maximilian Joseph in Bavaria.

Early life
Born in Brussels, Austrian Netherlands, Amélie Louise was the daughter of Prince Louis of Arenberg (1757–1795) and his first wife, Marie de Mailly, dame d'Ivry-sur-Seine (1766–1789).

Marriage and issue
Amélie Louise married Duke Pius August in Bavaria, son of Duke Wilhelm in Bavaria and his wife Countess Palatine Maria Anna of Zweibrücken-Birkenfeld, on 26 May 1807 in Brussels. Pius August and Amélie Louise had one son:

Duke Maximilian Joseph in Bavaria (4 December 1808 – 15 November 1888)

After their marriage, the couple moved to Bamberg and their son Maximilian Joseph was born the following year. In 1817, Amélie Louise sent her only son to reside with his great uncle Maximilian I Joseph of Bavaria, where he studied at the Royal Institute of Education. Amélie Louise did not see him until 1820. Shortly after returning from her second visit to Munich, Amélie Louise died in 1823 in Bamberg. She was interred in the burial crypt of Tegernsee Abbey.

Ancestry

References

1789 births
1823 deaths
Nobility from Brussels
House of Wittelsbach
Amelie Louise
Belgian Roman Catholics
German Roman Catholics
Duchesses of Bavaria